Launder or Launders may refer to:

 Launder (surname)
 Launders (surname)

See also
 Laundering (disambiguation), several types of washing,  literally or metaphorically